Wizard of Ahhhs is an EP by American indie rock group Black Kids, released by the band in August 2007 via free download on their official MySpace page. In November the band launched their official website, where the EP was available for download until March 2008. The EP was recorded at The Glow Studio in the spring of 2007 by fellow Jacksonville musician Jesse Mangum (Jesse and The Glow Studio have since relocated to Athens, GA.) Some of the other demo tracks recorded during the sessions have been leaked on the internet: "Listen to Your Body Tonight", "Designs on AKA You", "I Wanna Be Your Limousine", and "Love Me Already".

Newly recorded versions of the tracks appear on the Black Kids' debut album, Partie Traumatic.

Track listing
"Hit the Heartbrakes" – 3:37
"I'm Not Gonna Teach Your Boyfriend How to Dance with You" – 3:32 
"Hurricane Jane" – 4:27
"I've Underestimated My Charm (Again)" – 3:33

Personnel
 Owen Holmes – bass guitar
 Kevin Snow – drums
 Dawn Watley – keyboards and vocals
 Ali Youngblood – keyboards and vocals
 Reggie Youngblood – guitar and vocals

Critical response

The EP has gained favorable critical response, including an 8.4 rating and a "Best New Music" recommendation from Pitchfork Media. Pitchfork also placed the song "I'm Not Gonna Teach Your Boyfriend How to Dance with You" in their Top 100 Songs of 2007 and featured it on their Pitchfork Forkcast. In November 2007, Rolling Stone highlighted "Hit The Heartbrakes", giving the track 3.5 out of 4 stars. On December 28, 2007, The New York Post named "I'm Not Gonna Teach Your Boyfriend How To Dance With You" the #2 best song to download from 2007.

BBC Radio 1 has featured both "Hurricane Jane" (played by Zane Lowe) and "I'm Not Gonna Teach Your Boyfriend How to Dance with You" (played by Rob Da Bank and Colin Murray). Kate Nash performed a cover version of the song "I'm Not Gonna Teach Your Boyfriend..." on French radio station Ouï FM.

References

External links
Kate Nash's version of "I'm Not Gonna Teach Your Boyfriend How To Dance With You"
Yahoo Music Review: Black Kids - 'I'm Not Gonna Teach Your Boyfriend How To Dance With You'

2007 debut EPs
Albums free for download by copyright owner
Black Kids albums